FC Khimik-Avgust Vurnary is a Russian football team based in Vurnary, Chuvashia.

Club history
The team began to participate in amateur competitions in 1994. In the 2018–19 season, it first entered the Russian Cup.

For the 2022–23 season, Khimik-August received a professional license for the Russian Second League.

Current squad
As of 21 February 2023, according to the Second League website.

References

Association football clubs established in 1994
Football clubs in Russia
Sport in Chuvashia
1994 establishments in Russia